Isolachus is a genus of armoured harvestmen in the family Cladonychiidae. There is one described species in Isolachus, I. spinosus, found in Oregon and Washington.

References

Further reading

 
 
 

Harvestmen
Articles created by Qbugbot